Mark Ruffin is an American broadcaster, producer, and writer. He has won the regional Chicago / Midwest Emmy Awards two times, and has been nominated for a Grammy Award. Ruffin has been the Program Director/On-Air host for Sirius XM's Real Jazz channel since 2007.

Ruffin received both the Jazz Journalists Association's Career Excellence Award in Broadcasting and the Duke Dubois Humanitarian Award from Jazz Week in 2017.

Biography 
Mark Anthony Ruffin, was born in Chicago, IL on September 24, 1956. Ruffin's parents had a record store on the west side of the city for the first eight years of his life. He grew up in the suburb town of Maywood, Illinois where he graduated from Proviso East High School and studied Radio/TV and music at Southern Illinois University/Carbondale. Mark is the father to three sons: Melcolm Xavier Ruffin, Sidney-Bechet Mandela Ruffin, and Kenyatta Hents Philips-Ruffin.

Career 
Before rising to prominence in North America, Ruffin was a presence in Chicago jazz radio for over 25 years, where he was also Jazz Editor at Chicago Magazine from 1982 to 2007. He has had a varied multi-tasked career in radio, television, journalism, recorded music, and film – with a focus on Jazz and American culture in all the mediums.

Radio 
Since 2007, Ruffin has been the Program Director and On-Air host for Sirius XM's Real Jazz channel. 1980–2000, he started as an operations engineer at WBEZ-FM/Chicago. In 1980, he got his first on-air opportunity through the Jazz Institute of Chicago. From there: 1981–1985, Jazz Music Director WDCB/Glen Ellyn, 1985–1988, Music Director-WBEE-AM/Chicago, 1988–1996, Producer/Announcer WNUA/Chicago. 1996–2000, Announcer/Producer WBEZ/Chicago. 2002–2007, Ruffin joined Miles Ahead Incorporated which produced, Miles Ahead and Listen Here, two syndicated shows featuring him and Grammy Award-winning annotator and broadcaster Neil Tesser. The latter show was distributed by WFMT Satellite Network and was heard on up to 120 stations in the U.S. and Canada.

Ruffin was the original producer of the nationally syndicated Ramsey Lewis Show which was distributed by Westwood One in the 1990s. Since that time he has produced nationally syndicated programs for Oprah Winfrey, Gayle King, Steppenwolf Theatre Company, Dr. Robin Smith, Bruce Lundvall, Marcus Miller, Christian McBride, Don Was, Joey DeFrancesco and others.

Television 
2000–2007 Ruffin was a cultural correspondent for the Chicago PBS television station WTTW-TV. His pieces on Jazz and American culture were presented on the televisions shows Artbeat Chicago and Chicago Tonight. He won two Emmy Awards while at WTTW. 2014–2017 Ruffin was a recurrent moderator and host of the AOL Build Speaker Series where he was featured interviewing a number of personalities including Don Cheadle, Jon Batiste, Harry Connick Jr., Herb Alpert and many others.

Journalism 
Ruffin was the Jazz Editor of Chicago Magazine from 1982 to 2007, Contributor at Down Beat Magazine 1985–2005, Jazz Stringer at Chicago Sun-Times 1989–1997, Music Editor at N'Digo Magazine 1995–2005 and contributed to Jazziz, JazzUSA.com, Playboy, Ebony, Illinois Entertainer and many other publications.

Records

Annotator 
Ruffin has numerous annotation credits.

Associate producer 
 1987 Frank Mantooth – Per-Se-Vere
 1988 Rush Hour – Bumper To Bumper
 1989 Frank Mantooth – Suite Tooth

Producer 
 1998 Ron Miller – Sleepless (w/ Kevin Patrick & Steve Watkins)
 2001 George Freeman – At Long Last Love
 2003 Barbara Sfraga – Under The Moon
 2011 Giacomo Gates – The Revolution Will Be Jazz: Songs of Gil Scott-Heron
 2013 Taeko Fukao – Wonderland (w/ Taeko Fukao)
 2013 Giacomo Gates – Miles Tones
 2013 Rene Marie – I Wanna Be Evil; With Love to Eartha Kitt (w/ Rene Marie & Quentin Baxter)(Grammy Nominated)
 2015 Giacomo Gates – Everything Is Cool (w/ Giacomo Gates)
 2015 Charenee Wade – Offering: The Music of Gil Scott-Heron & Brian Jackson
 2017 George Freeman – 90 Going On Amazing (w/ Kevin Patrick)
 2017 Giacomo Gates – What Time Is It (w/ Giacomo Gates)
 2018 Lauren Henderson – Armame
2019 Carolyn Fitzhugh – Living in Peace

Film/TV

Music supervisor 
 1997 Tangled
 2004 A War On All Fronts: Life & Times of Robert R. McCormick (WTTW/PBS)
 2005 Mackinac Island: Mecca of the Midwest (WTTW/PBS)
 2017 The Drowning

Awards and nominations

References 

1956 births
Living people
American radio personalities
Jazz radio presenters
Regional Emmy Award winners